Giusto Bellavitis (22 November 1803 – 6 November 1880) was an Italian mathematician, senator, and municipal councilor.
According to Charles Laisant,
His principle achievement, which marks his place, in the future and the present, among the names of geometers that will endure, is the invention of the method of equipollences, a new method of analytic geometry that is both philosophical and fruitful.

Born in Bassano del Grappa in 1803 to Ernesto Bellavitis and Giovanna Navarini, Giusto studied largely alone. In 1840 he entered Institut Venitian and in 1842 began instructing at Lycee de Vicence. In 1845 he became professor of descriptive geometry at University of Padua. With the unification of Italy he took the opportunity to revise the curriculum to include complementary algebra and analytic geometry. Bellavitis married in 1842 and had one son who also taught geometry at the University of Padua.

Bellavitis anticipated the idea of a Euclidean vector with his notion of equipollence. Two line segments AB and CD are equipollent if they are parallel and have the same length and direction. The relation is denoted  In modern terminology, this relation between line segments is an example of an equivalence relation. The concept of vector addition was written by Bellavitis as

According to Laissant, Bellavitis published works in "arithmetic, algebra, geometry, infinitesimal calculus, probability, mechanics, physics, astronomy, chemistry, mineralogy, geodesy, geography, telegraphy, social science, philosophy, and literature."

Works

 1847:  via Biblioteca europea di informazione e cultura
 1852: Saggio sull'algebra degli immaginari, link from HathiTrust
 1854: Sposizione del Metodo della Equipollenze, link from Google Books.
 1858: Calcolo dei Quaternioni di W.R. Hamilton e sua Relazione col Metodo delle Equipollenze, link from HathiTrust.
 1868: Lezioni di Geometria Descrittiva, 2nd edition, link from HathiTrust

Awards
  Fellow of the Istituto Veneto in 1840
  Fellow of the Società Italiana dei Quaranta in 1850
  Member of the Accademia dei Lincei in 1879

References

 Michael J. Crowe (1967) A History of Vector Analysis, "Giusto Bellavitis and His Calculus of Equipollences", pp 52–4, University of Notre Dame Press.
 Charles-Ange Laisant (1887) Theorie et Applications des Equipollence, Gauthier-Villars, link from University of Michigan Historical Math Collection.
 Lena L. Severance (1930) The Theory of Equipollences; Method of Analytical Geometry of Sig. Bellavitis, link from HathiTrust.
 

1803 births
1880 deaths
19th-century Italian mathematicians
Algebraic geometers
People from Bassano del Grappa